Teleset is a television production company based in Bogotá, Colombia. It produced Metástasis, the Spanish-language remake of Breaking Bad.

Teleset's portfolio contains popular telenovelas such as La Baby Sister, The Useless One, Love in Custody, Three Miracles. Working hand in hand with SPT, Teleset has been a pioneer in the TV series genre with programs such as Rosario Tijeras, La prepago, Metastasis, Niñas mal, Popland, Lady, La sellera derosas, La Reina del Flow, El mariachi, En la mouth of the wolf, among others. In the entertainment part, Teleset has produced Colombian versions of world-renowned formats such as Who wants to be a millionaire?, Robinson Expedition, Factor X, Popstars, Colombia has talent, among others.

History
Teleset was founded in 1995 and is one of Colombia's largest independent television producers. On January 29, 2009, Sony Pictures Television International acquired a 50% stake in the company. On April 1, 2009, Sony Pictures Entertainment consolidated Teleset with its other US and international television companies under the SPT roof such as 2waytraffic, Embassy Row, Starling, and Lean-M. Teleset also has a division in Mexico.

Titles
The company's productions include:
   La reina soy yo
 Amor en Custodia
 
 La Baby Sister
 Rosario Tijeras 
 Cuando quiero llorar no lloro
 
 
 Los Protegidos
 El Inútil
 Isa TK+
 Señorita Pólvora

Teleset has also produced local versions of the following foreign series:

References

External links
 Official website
Teleset at Sony Pictures Television

1995 establishments in Colombia
Companies based in Bogotá
Mass media companies established in 1995
Television production companies of Colombia
Sony Pictures Television
Sony Pictures Entertainment
Colombian companies established in 1995
Sony Pictures Television telenovelas